This article contains information about the literary events and publications of 1997.

Events
February 20 – Allen Ginsberg makes a final public appearance at the NYU Poetry Slam. He continues to write through his final illness, his last poem being "Things I'll Not Do (Nostalgias)" written on March 30.
May 27 – Shakespeare's Globe in London, a reconstruction of the Elizabethan Globe Theatre, opens with a production of Shakespeare's Henry V.
June 3 – The supposed climax of Max Beerbohm's 1916 short story Enoch Soames occurs at the old British Museum Reading Room in London.
June 26 – J. K. Rowling's first Harry Potter novel, Harry Potter and the Philosopher's Stone, is published in London by Bloomsbury Publishing, in an edition of 500 copies.
July 13 – The release occurs in Ireland of the film of Patrick McCabe's 1992 novel The Butcher Boy. The author plays Jimmy The Skite, the town drunk.
September 1 – The Adventures of Captain Underpants, the first in Dav Pilkey's series of children's novels, is published by Scholastic.
October – The online literary magazine Jacket is founded.
November 24 – The new British Library building in London designed by Colin St John Wilson opens to readers.
December 30 – The memoir I Know Why the Caged Bird Sings by Maya Angelou is removed from the ninth-grade English curriculum in Anne Arundel County, Maryland, for portraying "white people as being horrible, nasty, stupid people".

Uncertain dates
Tom Clancy signs a deal with Pearson Custom Publishing and Penguin Putnam Inc. giving him US $50 million for the world English rights to two new books. A second agreement pays another $25 million for a four-year book/multimedia deal, and a third, with Berkley Books for 24 paperbacks to tie in with an ABC television miniseries for $22 million.
Janet Dailey admits to plagiarism of the novels of the fellow American bestselling romance writer Nora Roberts.

New books

Fiction
Ben Aaronovitch and Kate Orman – So Vile a Sin
Mitch Albom – Tuesdays With Morrie
Martin Amis – Night Train
Iain Banks – A Song of Stone
John Banville – The Untouchable
Hazel Barnes – The Story I Tell Myself
Marie Bashkirtseff (died 1884) – I Am the Most Interesting Book of All (translation)
Raymond Benson
Tomorrow Never Dies
Zero Minus Ten
Jonathan Blum and Kate Orman – Vampire Science
Roberto Bolaño – Last Evenings on Earth (Llamadas Telefonicas)
Pascal Bruckner – Les Voleurs de beauté
Simon Bucher-Jones – Ghost Devices
Christopher Bulis – A Device of Death
Tim Burton – The Melancholy Death of Oyster Boy & Other Stories
Candace Bushnell – Sex and the City
Peter Carey – Jack Maggs
Caleb Carr – The Angel of Darkness
Agatha Christie (died 1976) – collected short stories
The Harlequin Tea Set
While the Light Lasts and Other Stories
Daniel Clowes – Ghost World (graphic novel)
Warwick Collins – Gents
Bernard Cornwell
Sharpe's Tiger
Excalibur: A Novel of Arthur
Patricia Cornwell
Hornet's Nest
Unnatural Exposure
Paul Cornell – Oh No It Isn't!
Jim Crace – Quarantine
Robert Crais – Indigo Slam
Ann C. Crispin
The Hutt Gambit
The Paradise Snare
'Misha Defonseca' – Misha: A Mémoire of the Holocaust Years (published as non-fiction)
Don DeLillo – Underworld
Anita Diamant – The Red Tent
Terrance Dicks
The Eight Doctors
Mean Streets
Fernanda Eberstadt – When the Sons of Heaven Meet the Daughters of the Earth
Bernardine Evaristo – Lara
Charles Frazier – Cold Mountain
Anthony Frewin – London Blues
Anastasia Gosteva – Дочь самурая (The Samurai's Daughter)
John Grisham – The Partner
Barbara Hambly – Planet of Twilight
Allison Hedge Coke – Dog Road Woman
Matt Jones – Beyond the Sun
Sebastian Junger – The Perfect Storm
Winona LaDuke – Last Standing Woman
Joe R. Lansdale – Bad Chili
Paul Leonard – Genocide
Melissa Lucashenko – Steam Pigs
Ann-Marie MacDonald – Fall on Your Knees
Bernard MacLaverty – Grace Notes
Ian R. MacLeod – Voyages by Starlight
Norman Mailer – The Gospel According to the Son
Ian McEwan – Enduring Love
David A. McIntee – The Dark Path
Lawrence Miles
Down
Mark Morris – The Bodysnatchers
Toni Morrison – Paradise
Jim Mortimore – Eternity Weeps
Herta Müller – The Appointment
Ryū Murakami (村上 龍) – In the Miso Soup (イン ザ・ミソスープ, English translation 2005)
Courttia Newland – The Scholar
Kate Orman – The Room with No Doors
Hanne Ørstavik – Kjærlighet (Love)
Lance Parkin – The Dying Days
James Patterson – Cat and Mouse
Cyril Pearl – Morisson of Peking
John Peel – War of the Daleks
Pepetela – A Gloriosa Família
Marc Platt – Lungbarrow
Terry Pratchett – Jingo
Annie Proulx – "Brokeback Mountain" (short story)
Thomas Pynchon – Mason & Dixon
Kathy Reichs – Déjà Dead
Nina Revoyr – The Necessary Hunger
Justin Richards – Dragons' Wrath
Mordecai Richler – Barney's Version
Gareth Roberts – The Well-Mannered War
Philip Roth – American Pastoral
Arundhati Roy – The God of Small Things
Don Miguel Ruiz – The Four Agreements
Gary Russell
Deadfall
Instruments of Darkness
Will Self – Great Apes
Carol Shields – Larry's Party
Sidney Sheldon – The Best Laid Plans
Michael Stackpole – The Bacta War
Danielle Steel
The Ghost
The Ranch
Special Delivery
Dave Stone
Burning Heart
Ship of Fools
William Sutcliffe – Are You Experienced?
Antonio Tabucchi – The Missing Head of Damasceno Monteiro (La testa perduta di Damasceno Monteiro)
Kaoru Takamura –  (book publication completed)
Eckhart Tolle – The Power of Now
Zlatko Topčić – Nightmare
Kurt Vonnegut – Timequake
Lulu Wang – Het Lelietheater (The Lily Theatre)
Niall Williams – Four Letters of Love
Connie Willis – To Say Nothing of the Dog
Timothy Zahn – Specter of the Past
Roger Zelazny and Jane Lindskold – Donnerjack

Children and young people
Lloyd Alexander – The Iron Ring
Lynne Reid Banks – Harry the Poisonous Centipede: A Story to Make You Squirm (first in the Harry the Poisonous Centipede trilogy)
'Asta Bowen – Wolf: A Journey Home
Nancy Butts - The Door in the Lake
Cao Wenxuan (曹文軒) – The Grass House (草房子)
Sarah Ferguson – Budgie the Little Helicopter (first in an eponymous series of 5 books)
Mem Fox – Whoever You Are
Cornelia Funke – Dragon Rider
Virginia Hamilton (with Barry Moser) – A Ring of Tricksters: Animal Tales from America, the West Indies, and Africa
Mark Helprin (with Chris Van Allsburg) – The Veil of Snows
William Mayne – Lady Muck (illustrated by Jonathan Heale)
Eloise Jarvis McGraw – The Moorchild
Junko Morimoto – The Two Bullies
Barbara Nichol (with Barry Moser) – Dippers
Dav Pilkey – The Adventures of Captain Underpants (first in the Captain Underpants series of 12 books)
Philip Pullman – The Subtle Knife
Rick Riordan – Big Red Tequila
J. K. Rowling – Harry Potter and the Philosopher's Stone (first book in the Harry Potter series)
Ron Roy – The Absent Author (first in the A to Z Mysteries series of 26 books)
Simms Taback – There was an Old Lady who Swallowed a Fly
Vivian Walsh – Olive, the Other Reindeer
Jacqueline Wilson – Girls in Love

Drama
Jon Fosse – Nightsongs
Lee Hall – Spoonface Steinberg (radio monologue)
Moisés Kaufman – Gross Indecency: The Three Trials of Oscar Wilde
Thomas Kilroy – The Secret Fall of Constance Wilde
Conor McPherson – The Weir
Patrick Marber – Closer
Richard Nelson – Goodnight Children Everywhere
Peter Whelan – The Herbal Bed

Poetry

Ted Hughes – Tales from Ovid

Non-fiction
Dave Barry – Dave Barry's Book of Bad Songs
Jean-Dominique Bauby – The Diving Bell and the Butterfly (Le Scaphandre et le papillon)
Cari Beauchamp – Without Lying Down: Frances Marion and the Powerful Women of Early Hollywood
Jan Bondeson – A Cabinet of Medical Curiosities
Bill Bryson – A Walk in the Woods
D. K. Chakrabarti – Colonial Indology : sociopolitics of the ancient Indian past
Iris Chang – The Rape of Nanking
Jared Diamond – Guns, Germs and Steel
Jenny Diski – Skating to Antarctica
Michael Drosnin – The Bible Code
Gerina Dunwich – A Wiccan's Guide to Prophecy and Divination
Geoff Dyer – Out of Sheer Rage: In the Shadow of D. H. Lawrence
Timothy Ferris – The Whole Shebang: A State-of-the-Universe(s) Report
Benjamin Fondane (died 1944) – Le Voyageur n'a pas fini de voyager
Stephen Fry – Moab Is My Washpot (autobiography)
Charlotte Gray – Mrs. King
Alan Guth – The Inflationary Universe
Robert Hughes – American Visions: The Epic History of Art in America
Jesse Lee Kercheval – Building Fiction
Betty Kobayashi Issenman – Sinews of Survival
Geneviève Lacambre – Gustave Moreau : Maître sorcier
B. B. Lal – The Earliest civilization of South Asia: rise, maturity, and decline
Peter Maas – Underboss
Deborah Madison – Vegetarian Cooking for Everyone
James McBride – The Color of Water
Adele Morales – The Last Party: Scenes From My Life with Norman Mailer
Ian Smith – The Great Betrayal
Alan Sokal and Jean Bricmont – Fashionable Nonsense
Maria Todorova – Imagining the Balkans
Kevin Warwick – March of the Machines
Thierry Zéphir – Khmer: The Lost Empire of Cambodia

Births
February 12 – Alexander Nikolov, Bulgarian poet
June 22 – Aqiil Gopee, Mauritian writer and poet
November 28 – Franz Mherryon Robles, Filipino novelist and aphorist

Deaths
January 19 – James Dickey, American poet and novelist (born 1923)
February 3 – Bohumil Hrabal, Czech novelist (born 1914)
February 18 – Emily Hahn, American journalist and author (born 1905)
March 21 - Wilbert Awdry, British Anglican reverend and author (born 1911)
April 5 – Allen Ginsberg, American poet (liver cancer, born 1926)
May 9 – Rina Lasnier, Canadian poet (born 1915)
May 23 – Alison Adburgham, English social historian and journalist (born 1912)
June 8 – George Turner, Australian novelist and critic (born 1916)
June 11 – Susanna Roth, Swiss bohemist and literary translator (born 1950)
July 26 – Joseph Henry Reason, American librarian (born 1905)
August 2 – William S. Burroughs, American novelist (born 1914
August 16 – Gerard McLarnon, Irish actor and playwright (born 1915)
August 27 – Johannes Edfelt, Swedish poet, translator and critic (born 1904)
October 14 – Harold Robbins, American novelist (born 1916)
October 16 – James A. Michener, American novelist and historian (born 1907)
November 6 – Leon Forrest, African American novelist and essayist (cancer, born 1937)
November 30 – Kathy Acker, American novelist and poet (breast cancer, born 1947)
December 14 – Owen Barfield, British philosopher, author and poet (born 1898)

Awards
Nobel Prize for Literature: Dario Fo
Europe Theatre Prize: Robert Wilson
Camões Prize: Pepetela

Australia
The Australian/Vogel Literary Award: Eva Sallis, Hiam
C. J. Dennis Prize for Poetry: Les Murray, Subhuman Redneck Poems
Kenneth Slessor Prize for Poetry: Anthony Lawrence, The Viewfinder
Mary Gilmore Prize: Morgan Yasbincek, Night Reversing
Miles Franklin Award: David Foster, The Glade Within the Grove

Canada
Bronwen Wallace Memorial Award: Rachel Rose
Giller Prize for Canadian Fiction: Mordecai Richler, Barney's Version
See 1997 Governor General's Awards for a complete list of winners and finalists for those awards.
Edna Staebler Award for Creative Non-Fiction: Anne Mullens, Timely Death

France
Prix Goncourt: Patrick Rambaud, La Bataille
Prix Décembre: Lydie Salvayre, La Compagnie des spectres
Prix Médicis International: T. Coraghessan Boyle, America
Prix Médicis French: Les Sept Noms du peintre – Philippe Le Guillou

Spain
Premio Miguel de Cervantes: Guillermo Cabrera Infante

United Kingdom
Booker Prize: Arundhati Roy, The God of Small Things
Carnegie Medal for children's literature: Tim Bowler, River Boy
James Tait Black Memorial Prize for fiction: Andrew Miller, Ingenious Pain
James Tait Black Memorial Prize for biography: R. F. Foster, William Butler Yeats: A Life, Volume 1 – The Apprentice Mage 1965-1914
Cholmondeley Award: Alison Brackenbury, Gillian Clarke, Tony Curtis, Anne Stevenson
Eric Gregory Award: Matthew Clegg, Sarah Corbett, Polly Clark, Tim Kendall, Graham Nelson, Matthew Welton
Orange Prize for Fiction: Anne Michaels, Fugitive Pieces
Whitbread Best Book Award: Ted Hughes, Tales from Ovid

United States
Agnes Lynch Starrett Poetry Prize: Richard Blanco, City of a Hundred Fires
Aiken Taylor Award for Modern American Poetry: Fred Chappell
American Academy of Arts and Letters Gold Medal in Poetry, John Ashbery
Compton Crook Award: Richard Garfinkle, Celestial Matters
Hugo Award: Kim Stanley Robinson, Blue Mars
Nebula Award: Vonda McIntyre, The Moon and the Sun
Newbery Medal for children's literature: E. L. Konigsburg, The View from Saturday
Pulitzer Prize for Drama: no award given
Pulitzer Prize for Fiction: Steven Millhauser – Martin Dressler: The Tale of an American Dreamer
Pulitzer Prize for Poetry: Lisel Mueller: Alive Together: New and Selected Poems
Wallace Stevens Award: Anthony Hecht
Whiting Awards:
Fiction: Josip Novakovich (fiction/nonfiction), Melanie Rae Thon
Nonfiction: Jo Ann Beard, Suketu Mehta (fiction/nonfiction), Ellen Meloy
Plays: Erik Ehn
Poetry: Connie Deanovich, Forrest Gander, Jody Gladding, Mark Turpin

Elsewhere
International Dublin Literary Award: Javier Marías, A Heart So White
Premio Nadal: Carlos Cañeque, Quién

Notes

References

 
Years of the 20th century in literature